Balgowan railway station served the village of Balgowan, in the Scottish county of Perth and Kinross.

History

Opened on 21 May 1866 by the Crieff and Methven Junction Railway and then later absorbed by the Caledonian Railway, it became part of the London, Midland and Scottish Railway during the Grouping of 1923. Passing on to the Scottish Region of British Railways on nationalisation in 1948, the station was closed to passenger traffic by the British Railways Board on 1 October 1951.

References

 
 
 
 Station on navigable O.S. map

External links
 Railscot on the Crieff and Methven Junction Railway

Disused railway stations in Perth and Kinross
Railway stations in Great Britain opened in 1866
Railway stations in Great Britain closed in 1951
Former Caledonian Railway stations